Ensemble Studios was an American video game developer. It was founded by Tony Goodman in 1994 and incorporated the following year. It borrowed the name of Ensemble Corporation, a consulting firm founded by Goodman in 1990. It was acquired by Microsoft in 2001 and operated as an internal studio until 2009, when its development capabilities were officially disbanded. Ensemble developed many real-time strategy games, including the Age of Empires game series, Age of Mythology, and Halo Wars. In addition to game development, Ensemble Studios also made the Genie Game Engine used in Age of Empires, Age of Empires II: The Age of Kings, and Star Wars: Galactic Battlegrounds. The studio sold 20 million games and was worth an estimated $500 million.

Games
Ensemble Studios developed the Age of Empires game series of real-time strategy titles, comprising Age of Empires, Age of Empires II: The Age of Kings and Age of Empires III. They also released Age of Mythology, a spin-off from the original series. Expansion packs were also released for all their games including two for Age of Empires III. Their last release was the real-time strategy game called Halo Wars for Xbox 360.

Closure and legacy
In 1998, Rick Goodman left Ensemble Studios and started a new independent studio, Stainless Steel Studios.

In 2000, Brian Sullivan left Ensemble Studios and started a new independent studio, Iron Lore Entertainment, to develop the action role-playing game Titan Quest.

In 2001, Microsoft acquired Ensemble Studios for $100 million. Ensemble remained at their original location in a high rise office in Dallas, Texas, until April 2008 when Microsoft moved them to the Shops at Legacy in Plano, the same location as GearBox Software.   Their office was 50,000 square feet and designed to house 120 employees.

In 2008, Ensemble announced that it would close after the release of Halo Wars in 2009. According to multiple independent reports, all non-essential staff have been laid off and remaining staff have been given incentives to remain until the completion of the project. Microsoft issued an internal statement on September 10, 2008 which was then leaked to the public.

The company shut down on January 29, 2009.  It was also stated that there are at least two new studios being formed by ES employees.

In February 2009, former Ensemble Studios head Tony Goodman started a new independent studio, Robot Entertainment, and a number of the existing employees have been offered a position in this company.

Following the announcement of Robot Entertainment, former Ensemble Studios producer David Rippy started a new independent studio, Bonfire Studios, composed entirely of former Ensemble staff members. Bonfire was later renamed Zynga Dallas through its acquisition by Zynga and released only one game as an independent company.

In 2008, a third studio called Newtoy, Inc. was created by several developers from Ensemble, which released Chess With Friends for the iPhone in November 2008, and Words With Friends in August 2009. Newtoy was also acquired by Zynga and renamed Zynga With Friends, a moniker off of Newtoy's successful 'with friends' series. Newtoy released two games while they were independent.

In March 2009, a fourth studio, Windstorm Studios, was founded by ex-staffer Dusty Monk as a one-man company.  Dusty Monk later closed this studio on March 21, 2012 and joined Robot Entertainment with his former co-workers.

In June 2013, a fifth studio emerged, Boss Fight Entertainment, founded by previous employees of Ensemble Studios and Zynga Dallas. Boss Fight Entertainment is located in McKinney, Texas and is developing games for mobile platforms. The studio was acquired by Netflix Inc. in 2022.

References

External links
Ensemble Studios site
'Ask Sandy' threads from Age of Kings Heaven
Ensemble Studios profile on MobyGames
Remember Ensemble Studios - archived Ensemble material and news

 
Former Microsoft subsidiaries
Companies based in Dallas
American companies established in 1994
American companies disestablished in 2009
Video game companies established in 1994
Video game companies disestablished in 2009
Defunct video game companies of the United States
Video game companies based in Texas
Video game development companies
Defunct companies based in Texas
1994 establishments in Texas
2009 disestablishments in Texas